A National Diploma is a title that is used to represent a standard of academic or vocational education.  The title was first used in the United Kingdom, but has now been adopted by educational systems worldwide.

 National Diploma (Ireland), a three-year ab initio specialised higher education qualification in a technology discipline
 National Diploma (Mauritius)
 National Diploma (New Zealand)
 National Diploma (Nigeria)
 National Diploma (South Africa)
 National Diploma (Sri Lanka)
 National Diploma (United Kingdom), a standard academic qualification offered by most colleges and universities in the United Kingdom